Strike Back: Revolution (known as Strike Back: Silent War in the UK) is a ten-part British-American action television series, and serves as the seventh series of Strike Back featuring returning cast members Daniel MacPherson, Warren Brown and Alin Sumarwata. New cast members include Jamie Bamber and Yasemin Allen. The series premiered 10 January 2019 on OCS Choc in France, 25 January 2019 on Cinemax in the United States and premiered on 28 February 2019 on Sky One in the United Kingdom.

The series is set six months after the events of Retribution and sees the Section 20 team re-activated and placed under a new commander. They are sent to Malaysia to investigate a crashed Russian bomber and form an uneasy alliance with  Russian FSB Alpha Group agent Katrina Zarkova to locate a missing nuclear weapon.

Cast
Section 20
Daniel MacPherson as Sergeant Samuel Wyatt, US Joint Special Operations Command
Warren Brown as Sergeant Thomas "Mac" McAllister, British Army (ex-United Kingdom Special Forces)
Alin Sumarwata as Lance Corporal Gracie Novin, Australian Army Special Operations Command
Jamie Bamber as Colonel Alexander Coltrane, British Army, the new temporary commanding officer of Section 20
Varada Sethu as Lance Corporal Manisha Chetri, British Army

Federal Security Service (FSB)
Yasemin Allen as Captain Katrina Zarkova, FSB Alpha Group
Alec Newman as Lieutenant Pavel Kuragin, FSB Alpha Group Support
Marek Vasut as Colonel Beshnov, the leader and commanding officer of Alpha Group

Law Enforcement and Government Officials
Ann Truong as Inspector Amy Leong, Royal Malaysia Police
Adrian Edmondson as James McKitterick, British High Commissioner to Malaysia
Victoria Smurfit as Special Agent Lauren Gillespie, United States Drug Enforcement Administration
Naeim Ghalili as Colonel Aldo, Indonesian Special Forces Command
Richard Dillane as Chief of General Staff Pokrovsky, Russian Armed Forces

Antagonists
Tom Wu as Laoshu, a mercenary and enforcer for the Shun-Ko Triad
Teik Leong Lim as Kim Wei-Fong, the leader of the Shun-Ko Triad
Shivani Ghai as Anjali Vartak, a wealthy Indian Hindu nationalist
Aidan McArdle as Connor Ryan, a corrupt Irish lawyer working for Vartak
Rudi Dharmalingam as Gopan Laghari, the leader of Hindu militant organisation Shuddh Raashtr
Chris Obi as Jean-Baptiste Zaza, a Tutsi Rwandan drug lord based in Myanmar and leader of the Punchan Cartel
Faizal Hussein as Hassan Ahmed, the leader of Indonesian Islamic terror group Alssaff Alddina
Marama Corlett as Natasha Petrenko, a rogue Russian Foreign Intelligence Service (SVR) officer allied with Kuragin
Alex Waldmann as Artem Orlov, a former member of the 482nd Russian Marine Battalion allied with Kuragin

Episodes

References

2019 American television seasons
2019 British television seasons
E
Triad (organized crime)